José Hipolito Roncancio (born 22 November 1965) is a former Colombian racing cyclist. He rode in the 1989 Tour de France and the 1988 Vuelta a España.

References

External links

1965 births
Living people
Colombian male cyclists
Sportspeople from Bogotá